Tagliani is an Italian surname. Notable people with the surname include:

Alex Tagliani (born 1973), Canadian racing driver
Francesco Tagliani (born 1914), Italian footballer
Lizy Tagliani (born 1970), Argentine actress and comedian
Massimiliano Tagliani (born 1989), Italian footballer
Nicolás Tagliani (born 1975), Argentine footballer

See also
 Taliani, disambiguation

Italian-language surnames